= Subhodeep Mukherjee =

Subhadeep Bhattacharjee শুভদীপ মুখারজী
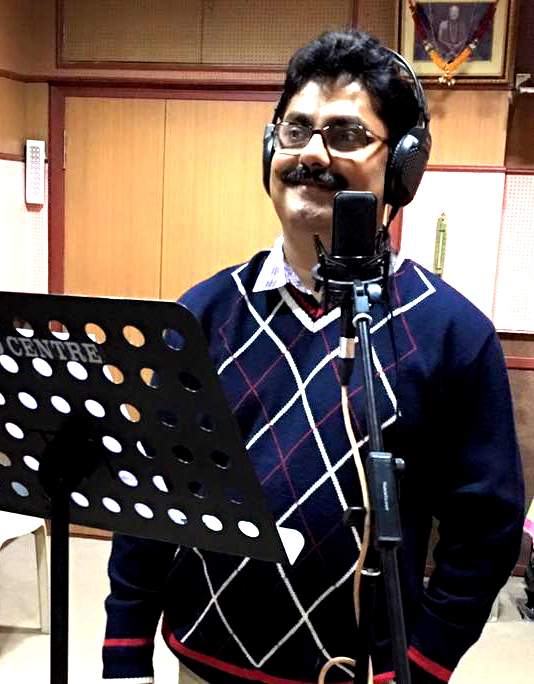
- At Gathani Studio, Subhodeep Mukherjee

Background information
- Born: 1970 (age 54–55); Kolkata, West Bengal, India
- Origin: West Bengal, India
- Genres: Hindustani classical music
- Years active: 2000–present

Subhodeep Mukherjee (Bengali: শুভদীপ মুখারজী) is a Ghazal singer. He performs Hindustani classical and experimental Ghazal ‘Jugalbandis’. He belongs to the Kolkata.

== Career ==
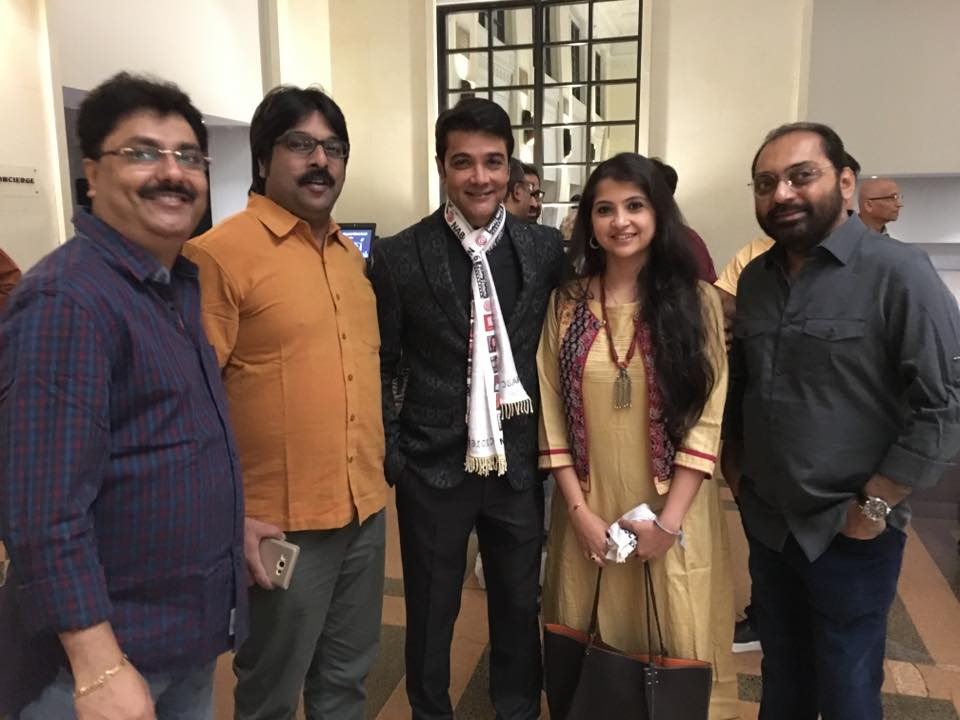

Subhodeep started performing professionally in various concerts from the year 2000. He played his international debut concert at Los Angeles, United States in 2015.
